Ohio State University Airport  is a public airport six miles (10 km) northwest  of downtown Columbus, in Franklin County, Ohio, United States. It is owned and operated by Ohio State University in Columbus.  It is also known as the OSU Don Scott Airport, named after Donald E. Scott, an OSU alumnus who died during his training as a pilot in the United Kingdom during World War II. The airport's main entrance is located on Case Road, and is easily accessible from OH-315 and Interstate 270.

The Ohio State University Airport serves the university while offering general aviation services for the public.

The OSU Airport began in 1943 as a flight training facility for military and civilian pilots, operated by the OSU School of Aviation. The OSU Airport is now a self-supporting entity of the Ohio State University through the Department of Aerospace Engineering & Aviation.
 
The Department oversees all aspects of the Airport from Airport Management, to Fixed-Base Operations, to Airport Maintenance.

The OSU Airport is a Part 139 Certificated Airport, serving as a general aviation reliever for the nearby John Glenn Columbus International Airport.

The OSU Airport is home to 160 aircraft, including single- and multi-engine, piston, and turbine engine aircraft and rotorcraft. It oversees about 71,000 operations per year and generally ranks in the top five airports in Ohio in the number of take-offs and landings with Cleveland Hopkins, John Glenn Columbus, Dayton, and Cincinnati Lunken.

The Airport is also home to the OSU Department of Aerospace Engineering & Aviation Gas Turbine Laboratory, several facilities operated by the OSU College of Agriculture, the Ohio Department of Transportation's Office of Aviation, fourteen corporate flight departments, and four flying clubs.

In 1967 the crew of a TWA 707 mistook the Ohio State University Airport for Port Columbus International Airport (now known as John Glenn Columbus International Airport). After shuttling all passengers and baggage to Port Columbus, and removing all galley equipment and seats, the plane was light enough to depart for the larger airport across town.

References

External links 
Historic photo; Don Scott field in 1954
Historic photo; Don Scott field in 1983

Airports in Ohio
Airport
Transportation in Columbus, Ohio
University and college airports
Airports established in 1943
1943 establishments in Ohio
Transportation buildings and structures in Franklin County, Ohio